Sheila Keith (9 June 1920 – 14 October 2004) was a British character actress, active in theatre, films and TV. She was born to Scottish parents in London while they were visiting the city and brought up in Aberdeen, Scotland. Longing to act, she trained at the Webber Douglas Academy of Dramatic Art in London.

Her stage career took her from repertory theatre at the Bristol Old Vic and Pitlochry, to West End appearances including Noël Coward's Present Laughter, Mame with Ginger Rogers, An Italian Straw Hat, Anyone for Denis?, and Deathtrap.

The Scotsman wrote: "In the Sixties, she was often seen in series such as The Saint, Public Eye and Sherlock Holmes. But she gained a national popularity when she went into Crossroads in 1967 as Mrs Cornet. It was the era when the soap was hugely popular and Noelle Gordon ruled the motel with a rod of iron...She played Lady Rosina in the BBC’s mammoth production of The Pallisers, Aunt Morag (keen on her whisky) in Hinge and Bracket's TV series Dear Ladies, Auntie Ethel in Moody and Pegg. She was also seen in the first run of Dr Finlay's Casebook.". Also, too, the Housekeeper, Mrs. Mitcham, in the Lord Peter Wimsey (TV series), The Unpleasantness at the Bellona Club episode, 1973.

But Sheila Keith remains best known for her excellent performances in the cult horror films of director Pete Walker, having played leading roles in shockers such as House of Whipcord, Frightmare, House of Mortal Sin, The Comeback and House of the Long Shadows. She played variously, a lesbian prison warder, a one eyed housekeeper, and an elderly cannibal, amongst other parts.

In her obituary, The Times described her as an "Actress of film, stage and television who became a 'British horror icon' ...It was with her portrayal of sinister, sadistic and deranged women in the horror movies of the director Pete Walker that she acquired her most devoted following".

Sheila Keith also had a memorable role as the Reverend Mother Stephen opposite Arthur Lowe, in all three series of the LWT sitcom Bless Me, Father.

Her final role was in the first episode of a horror spoof TV series, Dr. Terrible's House of Horrible, starring Steve Coogan, in 2001.

Films

External links

References

1920 births
2004 deaths
British stage actresses
British film actresses
British television actresses
Scottish film actresses